Stallone Limbombe (born 26 March 1991) is a Belgian professional footballer who plays as a winger for Nea Salamis Famagusta.

International career
Born in Belgium and of Congolese descent, Limbombe was called up to represent the DR Congo national football team in 2011.

Personal life
Stallone is the older brother of the footballers Bryan, Anthony and Maxime Limbombe.

References

External links

RD Congo Leopards Profile

1991 births
Living people
Sportspeople from Mechelen
Footballers from Antwerp Province
Association football midfielders
Belgian footballers
Belgian expatriate footballers
Belgian people of Democratic Republic of the Congo descent
K.R.C. Genk players
PSV Eindhoven players
Lierse Kempenzonen players
Royal Antwerp F.C. players
K.A.A. Gent players
Giresunspor footballers
Oud-Heverlee Leuven players
Nea Salamis Famagusta FC players
Othellos Athienou F.C. players
Belgian Pro League players
Challenger Pro League players
TFF First League players
Cypriot First Division players
Belgian expatriate sportspeople in Cyprus
Belgian expatriate sportspeople in the Netherlands
Belgian expatriate sportspeople in Spain
Belgian expatriate sportspeople in Turkey
Expatriate footballers in Cyprus
Expatriate footballers in the Netherlands
Expatriate footballers in Spain
Expatriate footballers in Turkey